Baring Plantation is a plantation in Washington County, Maine, United States. The population was 201 at the 2020 census. The plantation is named for Alexander Baring, 1st Baron Ashburton, the British negotiator of the Webster–Ashburton Treaty which ended the Aroostook War in 1838–1839.

Geography

Demographics

As of the census of 2000, there were 273 people, 113 households, and 81 families residing in the plantation.  The population density was 13.1 people per square mile (5.0/km).  There were 146 housing units at an average density of 7.0 per square mile (2.7/km).  The racial makeup of the plantation was 97.80% White, 0.37% African American, 0.37% Native American, and 1.47% from two or more races.

There were 113 households, out of which 27.4% had children under the age of 18 living with them, 61.9% were married couples living together, 8.8% had a female householder with no husband present, and 28.3% were non-families. 23.9% of all households were made up of individuals, and 8.8% had someone living alone who was 65 years of age or older. The average household size was 2.42, and the average family size was 2.85.

In the plantation, the population was spread out, with 22.0% under the age of 18, 9.2% from 18 to 24, 25.6% from 25 to 44, 29.3% from 45 to 64, and 13.9% who were 65 years of age or older. The median age was 41 years. For every 100 females, there were 103.7 males. For every 100 females age 18 and over, there were 102.9 males.

The median income for a household in the plantation was $30,536, and the median income for a family was $35,000. Males had a median income of $32,344 versus $19,531 for females. The per capita income for the plantation was $14,083.  About 12.5% of families and 20.2% of the population were below the poverty line, including 33.3% of those under 18 and 25.0% of those 65 or over.

Education
Baring Plantation students attend Calais High School or Woodland High School.

References

Plantations in Washington County, Maine
Plantations in Maine